Euroleague 2007–08 Individual Statistics is the statistics about players, playing in Euroleague 2007-08. Top 5 for each category.

Regular season

Points

Rebounds

Assists

Top 16

Points

Rebounds

Assists

Playoffs

Points

Rebounds

Assists

Final four

Points

Rebounds

Assists

Full Season

Points

Rebounds

Assists

References
Statistics

2007–08 Euroleague